Wang Jichang (died 945) was a general and chancellor of the Chinese Five Dynasties and Ten Kingdoms Period state Min.  He was a nephew of its last emperor Wang Yanzheng, and briefly served as chancellor and general during Wang Yanzheng's reign.

Background 
It is not known when or where Wang Jichang was born.  It is known, however, that he was a nephew of Wang Yanzheng — and, therefore, likely a grandson of Min's founding prince Wang Shenzhi (Prince Zhongyi) (although conceivably the grandson of one of Wang Shenzhi's brothers, Wang Chao or Wang Shengui.  His parents' identity were not otherwise given in traditional histories.

During Wang Yanzheng's Reign 
In 943, Wang Yanzheng, then in civil war against his brother, then-reigning Min emperor Wang Xi (Emperor Jingzong), declared himself the emperor of a new branch state Yin at his stronghold of Jian Prefecture (建州, in modern Nanping, Fujian).  He made Wang Jichang Menxia Shilang and chancellor with the designation Tong Zhongshu Menxia Pingzhangshi.

In 944, Wang Xi's general Zhu Wenjin assassinated Wang Xi and took the throne himself, but later that year was in turn killed by the general Lin Renhan, who then submitted the Min capital Fu Prefecture (福州, in modern Fuzhou, Fujian) to Wang Yanzheng.  The senior officials remaining at Fu went to Jian to request that he change the name of his state back to Min and move the capital back to Fu.  Wang Yanzheng agreed to the former but not the latter (as he anticipated having to defend against an attack from the northwestern neighbor Southern Tang), so he, keeping the capital at Jian, made Fu the southern capital and put Wang Jichang in the position of overseer of the southern capital.  He also sent the general Huang Renfeng with a detachment to Fu to aid Wang Jichang, along with the general Wu Chengyi, who had already been stationed there.

However, it was said that Wang Jichang was weak in personality and often taking to drinking, not caring about his soldiers.  The soldiers and the officers thus came to resent him.  Two former officers, Li Renda and Chen Jixun, in particular, were worried for themselves because they had both defected from Wang Yanzheng's army previously.  They met with Huang and persuaded him that Wang Yanzheng himself was in such a precarious position to defend against the Southern Tang attack such that they should rebel against him and seize control of Fu for themselves.  Huang agreed.  That day, they led an assault on the headquarters and killed Wang Jichang and Wu, seizing control of Fu.

Notes and references 

 Spring and Autumn Annals of the Ten Kingdoms, vol. 94.
 Zizhi Tongjian, vol. 284.

945 deaths
Year of birth unknown
Politicians from Fujian
Generals from Fujian
Min Kingdom chancellors
Min Kingdom generals
Assassinated Chinese politicians